The Chinese War Memorial is installed in the Hong Kong Zoological and Botanical Gardens. Erected in 1928, the memorial originally commemorated Chinese people who died during World War I. The structure was damaged during World War II, then repaired and rededicated to those who died during both conflicts. The Grade 1 confirmed memorial has two stone sculptures of male lions.

References

External links
 

1928 establishments in Hong Kong
Animal sculptures in Hong Kong
Central and Western District, Hong Kong
Grade I historic buildings in Hong Kong
Monuments and memorials in Hong Kong
Outdoor sculptures in Hong Kong
Sculptures of lions
Statues in Hong Kong
Stone sculptures in China
World War I memorials
World War II memorials

hu:Hongkongi kínai háborús emlékmű